Ombai-Wetar Strait may refer:

 in part, to Ombai Strait, which separates the Alor Archipelago from the islands of Wetar, Atauro, and Timor in the Lesser Sunda Islands
 in part, to Wetar Strait, which separates the island of Wetar from the eastern part of the island of Timor
 to the combination of those two straits